Anything Goes is the fourth studio album by American country music artist Gary Morris. It was released on July 15, 1985 via Warner Bros. Records. The album peaked at number 1 on the Billboard Top Country Albums chart.

Track listing

Personnel
Adapted from liner notes.

Gary Baker - bass guitar (track 10), background vocals (track 10)
Eddie Bayers - drums (tracks 1-4, 7, 9, 10)
Barry Beckett - electric piano (tracks 2, 7), piano (track 9)
Doris Belcher - background vocals (track 3)
Jamie Brantley - acoustic guitar (track 4), electric guitar (tracks 4, 6), background vocals (all tracks except 1 & 10)
Steve Brantley - background vocals (all tracks except 1 & 10)
Clyde Brooks - drums (tracks 6, 8)
Dennis Burnside - electric piano (tracks 8, 9), synthesizer (tracks 1-3, 6, 7)
Larry Byrom - acoustic guitar (track 4), electric guitar (tracks 2, 7, 9)
Bruce Dees - background vocals (tracks 2-5, 7-9)
Bob DiPiero - acoustic guitar (track 7)
Steve Gibson - acoustic guitar (tracks 2, 6), electric guitar (tracks 1, 3, 7, 9, 10)
Emily Harris - background vocals (track 3)
Gary Hooker - electric guitar (track 2), background vocals (track 6)
David Innis - synthesizer (all tracks except 4)
John Barlow Jarvis - electric piano (tracks 1, 8), piano (tracks 3-5, 8)
Robin Johnson - background vocals (track 3)
Bobby Jones - background vocals (track 3)
Derrick Lee - background vocals (track 3)
Josh Leo - electric guitar (tracks 1, 3, 6)
Mac McAnally - acoustic guitar (track 10), synthesizer (track 10), background vocals (track 10)
Gary Morris - lead vocals (all tracks), background vocals (track 1)
Michael Rhodes - bass guitar (all tracks except 5 & 10)
Tom Roady - percussion (tracks 2, 4, 7, 8)
John Scott Sherrill - acoustic guitar (track 7)
Paul Worley - acoustic guitar (tracks 1, 3), electric guitar (track 8)

Chart performance

References

1985 albums
Gary Morris albums
Warner Records albums
Albums produced by Jim Ed Norman